Anucha Munjarern (born 1979 in Surat Thani, Thailand) is a retired Thai futsal Pivot who is Thailand national futsal team's all-time top goalscorer. He was regarded as the icon of Thai futsal between 2000-2008 and was hailed as "พ่อมดฟุตซอล" (Thai Futsal Magician) by Thai futsal fans and media.

Honours

AFC Futsal Championship
 2000 - Third place 
 2002 - Third place 
 2003 - Third place 
 2004 - Third place 
 2008 - Runner-up

ASEAN Futsal Championship 
 2001 - Champions 
 2003 - Champions 
 2005 - Champions 
 2006 - Champions 
 2007 - Champions

Asian Indoor Games Futsal Championship 
 2005 - Runner-up 
 2007 - Runner-up

Individual

Best player 
 MVP AFC Futsal Championship: - 2002

See also
Thailand Beach Soccer Team
Thailand Squad On Fifa.com

References

Anucha Munjarern
1977 births
Living people
Anucha Munjarern
Southeast Asian Games medalists in futsal
Competitors at the 2007 Southeast Asian Games
Anucha Munjarern